Jennifer Anne Jankel (born May 1940)  is a retired British businesswoman and, since 2011, chair of the Jewish Music Institute in London. The daughter of bandleader Joe Loss and his wife Mildred, she was educated in London at St Paul's Girls' School, Hammersmith and the Lycée Français Charles de Gaulle in South Kensington. She became UK managing director  and, later, vice-president of French shoe company Charles Jourdan before opening her own shoe business, Luc Berjen. Examples of her shoes are now in the collections of the Victoria and Albert Museum.

She was married to the car designer Robert Jankel from 1962 until his death in 2005. The couple, who had three sons and a daughter together, were founder members of North West Surrey Synagogue in  Weybridge, of which she is now president.

References

External links
Profile on Jewish Music Institute website
Interview, 2013

1940 births
Living people
British Reform Jews
English Jews
English women in business
Jewish women in business
People associated with SOAS University of London
People educated at St Paul's Girls' School
Shoe business